"Over the Mountains" is a song by the Swedish pop singer Bosson. It was released in 2001 on MNW Music as the third single and as well as the fifth track from his second studio album, One in a Million (2001). It is a pop song that was written by Bosson and produced by the latter and by Tobias Lindell.

Track listing

Charts

References

External links
 
 
 
 
 

2001 singles
2001 songs
Bosson songs
Pop ballads